Madhavapeddi is an Indian surname. Notable people with the surname include:

Madhavapeddi Satyam (1922–2000), Telugu singer and stage actor
Madhavapeddi Suresh (born 1951), Indian music composer

Surnames of Indian origin